Marie de Sabrevois is the antagonist in two of Kenneth Roberts' Arundel novels—Arundel and Rabble in Arms (1929 and 1933). Conducting what we would now call psyops together with various males in the British North American establishment, she very nearly causes the failure of the Thirteen Colonies' armed Independence movement in the 18th Century.

She was written somewhat in the mold of historical figures such as Amy Lyon (AKA Emma Hart) and "Grietje" Zelle, with a dash of femme fatale from the detective fiction of Roberts' contemporaries.

Youth
 

She is originally named Mary and, like most of the major characters in the novel sequence, lives in the frontier seacoast village of Arundel in the Massachusetts Bay colony’s district of Maine. Her father is the alcoholic widower Mallinson, an object of local contempt who may have abused her (“Where did you learn so much about kissing?", the narrator asks her when they are both little more than children); in any case, she hopes to escape him through male rescue.

In the waning days of the French and Indian War (or La Guerre de la Conquête) Mary is casually abducted by a secret agent of Governor-General Vaudreuil of New France, who takes her up through Kennebec. The abduction is facilitated by the Governor-General's network among the Abenaki people who inhabit the woodlands from the coast over the watershed to the Saint-François River in Canada, New France. The agent is Henri Guerlac de Sabrevois, a seigneur and captain in the Béarn regiment, a "devil with the women" who watched Mary in Arundel with lascivious (and what we now called pedophiles intent. She will eventually take his surname, though as he has a wife in France this is done through the fiction that she is his little sister.

With the British conquest, the couple attempt to get away to old France, but are arrested at sea and interned at Elizabeth Castle until the Treaty of Paris (1763). Attracted by the conditions of the new British province of Québec under the peace, they soon return to America and Guerlac places Mary—now Marie—in a Montréal convent to learn, among other arts, astronomy. This may be how she makes the acquaintance of the director of the Saint-Sulpice Seminary (Montreal), who later proves to be a fanatical loyalist (anti-independence) spymaster before Guerlac brings her back down to Québec City to resume their cohabitation.

Counter-revolutionary Work
 
In 1775, after twelve years of Peace, the situation on the continent is exactly as Guerlac prophesied when undercover in the roadhouse run by the Arundel narrator—to the consternation of its regulars: 
 "The praying hypocrites in Massachusetts ... do they not intend ... to take Canada from the French? And that being considered done ... what else will there be for you to do but fight England? ...You must have help; and the only help to be had will be that of the papist French, who will fight even on the side of the Boston bigots to be revenged on England."

The course of the rebels’ march on Quebec is made more arduous by Guerlac’s relentless disinformation (he poses as an advisor in correspondence with rebel leader Benedict Arnold)—especially a rumor of espionage that eliminates the rebels’ most valuable Abenaki guide.

Marie is discovered by Arnold’s agents (the Arundel narrator and his towns fellow) in Guerlac's home, a large white house "with a curved roof such as Quebec folk build as protection against cannon shot—-a house sheltered among tall trees", to which "there's no man in Canada who is not honored to come ... officers and gentlemen!". The agents seize Guerlac and bind him but are nearly overcome themselves when Marie frees him. Finally he dies in a fall from the wall on New Year’s Day, 1776 (by the Gregorian calendar—always used in New France but new-fangled for the British and their insurgent colonials alike).

With the demise of her brother, Marie is left as the responsible aunt to Ellen Phipps. Ellen and her mother were among the British civilians captured at Fort William Henry and trafficked by the Abenaki—when Ellen was still only three—to Guerlac. When the mother died, the girl was placed in Marie's old convent in Montreal; Marie now moves her to the chateau of Moses Hazen, athwart the western prong of the rebel advance.

Marie is next seen in the opening scene of Rabble in Arms (1933; chronologically the second of the sequence)—at the great rotunda at Ranelagh Gardens, in the spring of 1776. Meeting this novel's narrator and his brother, Arundel men, she pretends never to have heard of the town and recasts for their benefit the late Guerlac as having been her father, whose property she has come to England to dispose of. Marie, however, and her new escort—her Canadian uncle Lanaudiere (AKA Mr. Leonard), another peripheral figure in British intelligence—are here to see Lord Germain (later Viscount Sackville).

Using such American code as lobsterbacks, Marie convinces her townsfellows of her likemindedness. But there is a romantic as well as political bewitchment afoot: the victim in Rabble is not the narrator but rather his Harvard-educated and Loyalist brother, Nathaniel, whom she easily gets to take to America details of the coming imperial counterinsurgency expedition under General (and playwright) John Burgoyne. His contact, and Marie’s second unwitting mule, is Ellen, at Hazen's chateau in Iberville, Quebec, where a close civilian eye may be kept on the rebels moving down the Richelieu via Fort Saint John. Hazen’s loyalties are suspect (at least to Roberts’ characters, which is to say he may be loyal in fact to King George while receiving his salary from the Continental Congress). Through such acts as the loss/surrender at the Battle of the Cedars and the employment of the incompetent Timothy Bedel, Hazen has alienated rebel (and reader) sympathy.

References

Fictional secret agents and spies